Hoober Ward is a ward in the Metropolitan Borough of Rotherham, South Yorkshire, England.  The ward contains ten listed buildings that are recorded in the National Heritage List for England.  All the listed buildings are designated at Grade II, the lowest of the three grades, which is applied to "buildings of national importance and special interest".  The ward contains the villages of West Melton and Brampton Bierlow and the surrounding area.  Most of the listed buildings are houses, and the others include two churches, a farm, a barn, a school house and schoolroom, a bridge, and two mileposts.


Buildings

References

Citations

Sources

 

Lists of listed buildings in South Yorkshire
Buildings and structures in Rotherham